"I'm on Fire" is the debut single by the Dwight Twilley Band released in April 1975. "I'm on Fire" was later included on the Dwight Twilley Band's first album Sincerely released in July 1976.

Background
The single has a unique mix, with added reverb and vocal overdubs compared to the LP version.  This mix can be found on the Rhino CD compilation 'Have A Nice Day, Vol. 15', released in 1990.

Chart performance
The single peaked at number 16 on the Billboard Hot 100, in August 1975.

References 

1975 singles
1975 songs
Shelter Records singles
American power pop songs